Fissurella subrostrata is a species of sea snail, a marine gastropod mollusk in the family Fissurellidae, the keyhole limpets.

Description
The size of an adult shell reaches 30 mm.

Distribution
This marine species is found along St Vincent, West Indies

References

 

Fissurellidae
Gastropods described in 1835